Christina 'Licorice' McKechnie  (born 2 October 1945) is a Scottish musician. She was a singer and songwriter in The Incredible String Band between 1968 and 1972. Her whereabouts have been publicly unknown since 1987, when she was last seen hitchhiking across the Arizona desert.

Biography
McKechnie was born in Edinburgh, Scotland.  After reading her poetry at folk clubs in Edinburgh, she met the musician Robin Williamson, but left home in her teens with the intention of marrying Bert Jansch.  The banns were published but the wedding never took place.  Jansch left her behind to travel to Morocco in 1963, and, according to Williamson, "she fell into [my] arms".  In 1966 she travelled to Morocco with Williamson, and was later involved in the Incredible String Band's recordings. Her first contribution to the band came in the form of backing vocals on the track "Painting Box", on the 1967 album The 5000 Spirits or the Layers of the Onion.  By 1968, she was regarded as a fully-fledged member of the band, usually as a backing singer and percussionist, and she performed with them at the Woodstock Festival in August 1969.   By 1972 she had left the band, after her relationship with Williamson ended.

In 1974, McKechnie appeared onstage at a Scientology benefit concert in East Grinstead with Mike Garson, Woody Woodmansey, Leonard Halliwell and others, before moving to California and joining the Silver Moon Band. She married the musician Brian Lambert; they later divorced. She appeared with Williamson and his Merry Band in 1977, and is credited as Likky Lambert on the 1977 album Journey's Edge, before joining Woody Woodmansey's band U-Boat.

She visited Edinburgh in 1986 to see her family, but her whereabouts have been unknown since 1990, when, according to her sister, she was in Sacramento, California, apparently recovering from surgery. The music journalist Mark Ellen wrote in Mojo magazine in 2000 that she was "last seen in 1987 hitchhiking across the Arizona Desert. Not even her family has heard from her since." Fellow former Incredible String Band member Rose Simpson was quoted as saying: "There's a possibility she may be dead."

See also
List of people who disappeared

References

External links
Recording of Brian Lambert interview, 2019, discussing his life with Licorice McKechnie

1945 births
1980s missing person cases
20th-century Scottish women singers
Missing people
Missing person cases in California
Musicians from Edinburgh
Scottish songwriters
The Incredible String Band members